In Hindu cosmology, the Ocean of Milk (Malayalam: Pālāḻi) is the fifth from the centre of the seven oceans. It surrounds the continent known as Krauncha. According to Hindu scriptures, the devas and asuras worked together for a millennium to churn this ocean in order to acquire amrita, the elixir of immortal life. It is spoken of in the Samudra Manthana chapter of the Puranas, a body of ancient Hindu legends. The Kshira Sagara is described to be the place where the deity Vishnu reclines over his serpent-mount Shesha, accompanied by his consort, Lakshmi.

Etymology

The term varies across Indic languages, referred to as Khir Sagar in Bengali, Tiruppāṟkaṭal in Tamil, and Pāla Kadali in Telugu.

The Churning of the Ocean

The Kshira Sagara is the site of the legend of the Samudra Manthana, the churning of the cosmic ocean. At the suggestion of Vishnu, the devas and asuras (races of celestial beings) churned the primeval ocean in order to obtain amrita, the elixir of immortality. To churn the ocean, they used the serpent-king, Vasuki, for their churning rope. For a churning pole, they used Mount Mandara, placed on the back of the Kurma avatar of Vishnu. As the devas and asuras churned the ocean, the terrible poison halahala issued from its depths, and began to envelop the universe with its choking fumes. Gasping for breath, the devas and asuras sought the help of Shiva, who swallowed the poison into his throat. His consort, the goddess Parvati, grasped him by the throat, trapping the poison there and preventing it from spreading; but, such was the strength of the poison, that it turned his neck blue, thereby earning him the epithet of Nilakantha (the blue-throated one). 

When the amrita finally emerged along with several other treasures, the devas and asuras fought over it. However, Vishnu, in his form of the enchantress Mohini, managed to manipulate the asuras into allowing him to be the one to distribute the elixir, upon which he offered it only to the devas. Svarbhanu, an asura, disguised himself as a deva in order to partake of the amrita. Surya (the sun-god) and Chandra (the moon-god) alerted Vishnu to this deception. Vishnu then decapitated Svarbhanu after the asura's consumption of the elixir, leaving his head and decapitated body immortal. Later, his head became known as Rahu and the beheaded part became known as Ketu.

According to the Mahabharata, a number of ratnas (treasures) emerged during the churning of Kshira Sagara: Kamadhenu, the cow of plenty, Varuni, the goddess of wine, the tree Parijata, the apsaras, the crescent moon, the poison halahala, and Dhanvantari (the physician of the devas), holding a cup of amrita in his hand. He was followed by Lakshmi, the goddess of prosperity, the horse Uchchaishravas, the gemstone Kaustubha, the elephant Airavata, the wish-granting tree Kalpavriksha, and the conch Panchajanya. The Puranas include the emergence of Alakshmi, the goddess of misfortune, Riddhi and Siddhi, Pushkara, and a number of botanical substances.

The churning of the ocean is told in several ancient texts, notably in the Valmiki's Ramayana Canto 45  and in the Mahabharata.

Literature

Vishnu Purana 
The Vishnu Purana describes the origin of Lakshmi from the Sea of Milk:

Tiruvaymoli 
The Ocean of Milk (Tiruppāṟkaṭal) is mentioned in Tiruvaymoli, a Vaishnava work of Tamil literature:

Devi Bhagavata Purana 
The Devi Bhagavata Purana also refers to the Ocean of Milk in its verses:

Abodes
Vaikuntha, covered with water in the material world, which is an inestimable distance away in the direction of the Makara Rashi (Shravana Zodiac) or the Capricorn Constellation. Upon this realm is a place called Vedavati, where Vishnu resides.
On the island known as Svetadvipa, there is an Ocean of Milk, and in the midst of that ocean, is a place called Airavatipura, where Aniruddha lies on Ananta.

Cosmologically, the dvipas (islands) and sagaras (seas) depict the entire cosmos, though in cosmography, all the dvipas and sagaras are shown to lie in the Southern Hemisphere. In some of the satvata-tantras there is a description of the nine varshas and the predominating Deity worshiped in each:

Vasudeva
Sankarshana
Pradyumna
Aniruddha
Narayana
Narsimha
Hayagriva
Mahavaraha
Parashurama

Paramatma, the Supersoul, in the heart of all avatars that exist in the material universe live in the Kshira Sagara. According to some Vaishnava traditions, the Paramatma is Ksirodakasayi Vishnu – who is in every atom and heart of all 8 400 000 kinds of material bodies, as the soul in each heart called atma, which in essence is the same as Paramatma.

See also
Vaikuntha
Narayana
Ksirodakasayi Vishnu
Paramatma

References

External links
The story of the churning as told in the epic Mahabharata, here in the online English translation by Kisari Mohan Ganguli at sacred-texts.com.
The story of the churning as told in the epic Ramayana, here in the online English verse translation by Ralph T. H. Griffith at sacred-texts.com.
The story of the churning as told in the Vishnu Purana, here in the online English translation by Horace Hayman Wilson at sacred-texts.com.

Locations in Hindu mythology
Milk in culture
Divya Desams